Christopher Campoli (born July 9, 1984) is a Canadian professional ice hockey player for the Dundas Real McCoys of the Ontario Hockey Association's Allan Cup Hockey. He played for the Chicago Blackhawks, Ottawa Senators, New York Islanders, and Montreal Canadiens in the National Hockey League (NHL).

Playing career

Junior
Campoli played minor ice hockey in the Greater Toronto Hockey League (GTHL) for the Mississauga Senators. He played in the 1998 Quebec International Pee-Wee Hockey Tournament with a team from Vaughan. He then played four years in the Ontario Hockey League for the Erie Otters, from 2000 to 2004, the final season as team captain. He volunteered at the Erie Unit of the Shriners Hospital for Children, playing card and board games with the children, and assisting staff by taking height and weights of the patients. His charity work in and around the city of Erie, Pennsylvania, earned him the Dan Snyder Memorial Trophy as the OHL's top humanitarian in 2003-04.

Chris Campoli attended John Cabot Catholic Secondary School for two years before leaving to play for the Erie Otters.

Professional

Campoli was a seventh-round selection, 227th overall by the New York Islanders in the 2004 NHL Entry Draft. He appeared in 80 games with the Islanders in his rookie NHL season of 2005–06, recording nine goals and twenty five assists. Campoli scored his first goal in his first game on his first shot when he beat Buffalo Sabres goaltender Ryan Miller on a rebound to tie the game at one at the 6:40 mark of the first period.

A groin injury towards the end of training camp, coupled with changes to the Islander coaching staff delayed Campoli's 2006–07 season debut.  Following the trade of Alexei Zhitnik, Campoli was recalled from the Bridgeport Sound Tigers of the American Hockey League (AHL).  On July 16, 2007, Campoli was signed to a three-year extension by the Islanders. On November 3, 2008, Campoli became the first player since Ken Doraty in 1934 to score in overtime twice in a game against the Columbus Blue Jackets when he fired an initial shot past goaltender Fredrik Norrena that went through the netting, but was not seen by the officials, then circled around, shot and scored again.

On February 20, 2009, Campoli was traded by the Islanders, along with Mike Comrie, to the Ottawa Senators for Dean McAmmond and a first-round draft pick in 2009.

On February 28, 2011, Campoli was traded by the Senators, along with a conditional 2011 seventh-round draft pick, to the Chicago Blackhawks for a conditional 2011 second-round draft pick and Ryan Potulny. After committing a costly turnover that allowed Alexander Burrows to score the series-winning goal against the Blackhawks, Campoli entered the 2011 off-season as a restricted free agent. According to Blackhawks general manager Stan Bowman, the two sides were far apart in contract negotiations and on July 15, 2011, Bowman announced that Campoli would not be returning to the team for the following season.

He was signed as a free agent by the Montreal Canadiens to a one-year deal just prior to the 2011–12 season on September 26, 2011. He recorded two goals and nine assists with the Canadiens but they did not renew his contract.

After failing to find an NHL club for the lockout shortened 2012–13 season, on February 7, 2013, he signed with Swiss club, EHC Biel of the National League A for the remainder of the season. Campoli opted to remain in the NLA the following season, signing a one-year contract with fellow Swiss club, HC Lugano, on July 29, 2013. Early into the 2013–14 season, after only 8 games with Lugano, Campoli opted to leave the Swiss league and transfer for the remainder of the season to the Swedish Hockey League with HV71. Having established a regular role on the blueline on February 21, 2014, Campoli agreed to a two-year contract extension to remain with HV71. He finished the season with 3 goals and 9 points in 33 games.

Two year after concluding his professional career, Campoli returned to playing in agreeing to join Senior men's team, the Stoney Creek Generals, to compete for the Allan Cup on October 18, 2018.

Career statistics

Regular season and playoffs

International

Awards and honours

References

External links

1984 births
Living people
Canadian expatriate ice hockey players in Sweden
Canadian expatriate ice hockey players in Switzerland
Canadian sportspeople of Italian descent
Bridgeport Sound Tigers players
Canadian ice hockey defencemen
Chicago Blackhawks players
EHC Biel players
Erie Otters players
HC Lugano players
HV71 players
Montreal Canadiens players
New York Islanders draft picks
New York Islanders players
Ottawa Senators players
Sportspeople from North York
Ice hockey people from Toronto